Airmail (or air mail) is a mail transport service.

Airmail may also refer to:
Airmail (album), a 2000 album by Epicure
Air Mail (magazine), a digital publication founded in 2019
Air Mail (album), a 1981 album by Air
Air Mail (film), a 1932 American film by John Ford
Airmail (fresco), a 1937 American fresco painting by Edwin Boyd Johnson
The Air Mail, a 1925 silent film directed by Irvin Willat
Air Mail (video game), a 2012 iOS game
Airmail (email client), an email client for iPhone and Mac OS X